Håvard Lothe (born 1982) is a Norwegian musician who released his first album, Live in Concert in 2007, which reached number 32 on the Norwegian Albums Chart.

Band members
Håvard Lothe – vocals, guitars, mandolin
Erlend Mongstad – piano, synthesizer, rhodes, organ
Thomas Frøyen – drums, percussion
Torstein Mongstad – bass guitar, double bass
Werner Bryn – cello

Discography
Live in Concert, Reel Noise Records (Released 3 September 2007)
Dorian Grey, Reel Noise Records (Due to be released 31 August 2009)

References

External links
Håvard Lothe Official website (norwegian)
MySpace: Håvard Lothe

1982 births
Norwegian musicians
Living people
Place of birth missing (living people)